Thomas Ravelli (born 13 August 1959) is a Swedish former professional footballer who played as a goalkeeper. His 21-year professional career was almost exclusively associated with Öster and Göteborg, for whom he appeared in a combined 416 Allsvenskan games. The most-capped player for the Sweden national team for several years, Ravelli represented the nation at the 1990 and 1994 FIFA World Cups, and UEFA Euro 1992.

Club career
Ravelli was born in Västervik, but grew up in Vimmerby where he lived his first five years of life. At the club level he played for Östers IF and IFK Göteborg, winning three Allsvenskan championships during his ten-year tenure with the former team before signing for the latter in 1989, at the age of 29.

With Göteborg, Ravelli conquered a further six leagues and his only Swedish Cup. In 1998, already 39, he joined the Tampa Bay Mutiny of Major League Soccer, closing out his career the following year with his first club; in total, he played in nearly 600 official matches as a professional.

International career
Ravelli's international career spanned almost two decades, starting in 1981. He played in the 1990 FIFA World Cup, UEFA Euro 1992, and the 1994 World Cup, with Sweden finishing third in the latter tournament, and appeared in a total of 143 games. The 1994 World Cup semi-final against Brazil was Ravelli's 116th game for Sweden, overtaking Björn Nordqvist's appearances record.

He is well known for saving two penalties during the shootout against Romania in 1994 World Cup's quarter-final clash, including one in the "sudden death" by Miodrag Belodedici (5–4 win). This feat led to him finishing second in the year's race for Goalkeeper of the Year, and he was also named by France Football as the seventh best player in Europe.

Style of play
Extroverted, experienced and highly competitive with a tall and slender frame, known for his leadership and vocal presence in goal in spite of his eccentric and temperamental personality, Ravelli was a traditional, consistent and efficient goalkeeper with solid all-round fundamentals, who was regarded in particular for his positional sense and ability to read the game and organise his defence; considered to be a world-class player in his position in his prime, as well as one of Sweden's greatest goalkeepers ever, he also possessed good elevation and shot-stopping abilities, which enabled him to produce acrobatic saves without having to resort to histrionics, and was known for his command of his area and speed when rushing off his line, as well as his ability to close down his opponents and get over the ball quickly. He also stood out for his longevity throughout his career; however, he also came into criticism at times from his managers over his poor work-rate in training.

Although Ravelli was not known to be a penalty-saving specialist, Ravelli drew attention to himself in the media when he stopped two penalties in Sweden's quarter-final penalty shoot-out victory over Romania at the 1994 World Cup.

Ravelli was also known for his temperament among teammates, and he was also known to be a prankster, at one point cutting holes into Martin Dahlin's underwear.

Personal life
Ravelli's twin brother, Andreas, is also a former footballer. Their father, Dr. Peter Ravelli, was an Austrian immigrant of Italian descent who moved to Sweden in 1952, and the siblings played alongside each other at Öster and the national team.

Ravelli participated as a celebrity dancer in Let's Dance 2019, broadcast on TV4.

Career statistics

Club

International

Honours
Östers IF
Allsvenskan: 1978, 1980, 1981

IFK Göteborg
Allsvenskan: 1990, 1991, 1993, 1994, 1995, 1996
Svenska Cupen: 1991
Sweden
FIFA World Cup bronze: 1994
Individual
Guldbollen: 1981
Swedish Goalkeeper of the Year: 1995, 1997
IFFHS World's Best Goalkeeper: Silver Ball 1994, Bronze Ball 1995

See also 
 List of men's footballers with 100 or more international caps

References

External links

1959 births
Living people
Swedish twins
Swedish people of Austrian descent
Swedish people of Italian descent
Twin sportspeople
Swedish footballers
Association football goalkeepers
Allsvenskan players
Superettan players
Östers IF players
IFK Göteborg players
Major League Soccer players
Tampa Bay Mutiny players
Major League Soccer All-Stars
Sweden international footballers
1990 FIFA World Cup players
1994 FIFA World Cup players
UEFA Euro 1992 players
Sweden under-21 international footballers
Sweden youth international footballers
Swedish expatriate footballers
Expatriate soccer players in the United States
Swedish expatriate sportspeople in the United States
FIFA Century Club
People from Västervik Municipality
Sportspeople from Kalmar County